Ryan Dalziel (born 12 April 1982), is a Scottish professional racing driver.  Dalziel has seen the most success in his career in the United States, racing in the American Le Mans Series GT1 class and the Champ Car World Series, and winning the 2010 24 Hours of Daytona.

Career
Born in Glasgow, Dalziel began his car racing career in 1999 in Formula Vauxhall.  He drove in British Formula Renault and British Formula 3, before moving to the United States.  From 2002 until 2004, he spent three years in the Toyota Atlantic Championship, finishing runner-up twice, before moving to the American Le Mans Series in 2005.  He also contested one Champ Car race for Dale Coyne Racing at Toronto, finishing 9th. In 2006, he drove a Daytona Prototype in the Rolex Sports Car Series. From 2007 to 2009, he drove part-time with various teams in the Daytona Prototype class, then returned full-time in 2010.

Dalziel returned to the Champ Car World Series in 2007 as driver of one of the two Pacific Coast Motorsports cars. He was dropped by the team and replaced by Mario Domínguez in September 2007, with two races of the season remaining. His best Champ Car finish was 7th place in the Toronto Grand Prix, at the only track he raced a Champ Car at more than once. In 2008 he piloted SAMAX Motorsport's Riley-BMW Daytona Prototype alongside teammate Henri Zogaib. He also competed in the inaugural season of Superleague Formula.

In 2009 Zogaib became under investigation for operating a Ponzi scheme in which he reportedly conned Dalziel and his father out of US$550,000. In May 2009, Dalziel won his judgement over Zogaib in the amount of US$608,000 and continues to legally battle to retrieve his money.
In 2009 Dalziel competed for Orbit Racing in the Grand American Sports Car Series recording one podium finish and numerous top tens.

Dalziel and teammates Terry Borcheller, João Barbosa, and Mike Rockenfeller won the 2010 Rolex 24 at Daytona driving a Porsche Riley for Action Express Racing. Following this, he began driving full-time for Starworks Motorsports alongside Mike Forest.

On 26 January 2012, Dalziel scored his first career Rolex Sports Car Series pole position in the 2012 24 Hours of Daytona in the No. 8 Starworks Motorsport Riley-Ford Daytona Prototype. He went on to finish second in the race with teammates Allan McNish, Lucas Luhr, Enzo Potolicchio and Alex Popow. He won the Watkins Glen 200 and six podiums, finishing runner-up in the Rolex DP drivers championship. Also, Dalziel got three LMPC class wins at the American Le mans Series with Core, including Petit Le Mans.

At the 2012 12 Hours of Sebring, Dalziel scored a surprise 3rd-overall finish with co-drivers Enzo Potolicchio and Stéphane Sarrazin, also taking 1st place in the WEC LMP2 class. He also won the 2012 24 Hours of Le Mans with Enzo Potolicchio and Tom Kimber-Smith, driving the Starworks Motorsport HPD ARX-03b in LMP2. As a result, he claimed the LMP2 teams championship.

The Brit continued Starworks in the 2013 Rolex DP class. Partnering with Alex Popow, he got one win and five podiums. He also competed in four ALMS rounds in different classes.

In 2014, Dalziel was signed by Extreme Speed Motorsports to drive an HPD LMP2 at the new IMSA United SportsCar Championship, with Scott Sharp as co-driver. He got two overall podiums, but missed two rounds and collected four DNFs, ending 10th in the Prototype teams championship. Later he drove in the final three rounds of the Pirelli World Challenge with an Effort Porsche 911 GT3, collecting two wins and three second-place finishes in six races.

Dalziel continued with Extreme Speed Motorsports in 2015 but at the FIA World Endurance Championship.  With David Heinemeier Hansson as third driver, he finished seventh in the standings. Also, he remained driving an Effort Porsche 911 GT3 in the Pirelli World Challenge. He claimed two wins and ten podiums in 17 races, finishing third in the standings despite missing two rounds.

In 2016, Dalziel will continue with ESM in the WEC, and will enter the IMSA SportsCar Championship with a VisitFlorida Racing Corvette DP at all rounds except Long Beach, due to a conflict with the WEC.

Motorsports Career results

American open–wheel racing results
(key)

Atlantic Championship

Champ Car

Superleague Formula
(Races in bold indicate pole position) (Races in italics indicate fastest lap)

Sports Car Racing results
(key)

Complete FIA World Endurance Championship results

IMSA WeatherTech SportsCar Championship results
(key)(Races in bold indicate pole position, Results are overall/class)

* Season still in progress

Pirelli World Challenge results

* Season is still in progress.

24 Hours of Le Mans results

References

External links
 Official Homepage

1982 births
Living people
Scottish racing drivers
Sportspeople from Glasgow
British Formula Renault 2.0 drivers
Champ Car drivers
Rolex Sports Car Series drivers
Atlantic Championship drivers
Superleague Formula drivers
24 Hours of Daytona drivers
American Le Mans Series drivers
24 Hours of Le Mans drivers
FIA World Endurance Championship drivers
WeatherTech SportsCar Championship drivers
Blancpain Endurance Series drivers
24 Hours of Spa drivers
GT World Challenge America drivers
Extreme Speed Motorsports drivers
Dale Coyne Racing drivers
Starworks Motorsport drivers
Mercedes-AMG Motorsport drivers
RC Motorsport drivers
Action Express Racing drivers
Alan Docking Racing drivers
United Autosports drivers
DragonSpeed drivers
Meyer Shank Racing drivers